These are the full results of the 2006 European Cup Super League which was held on 28 and 29 June 2006 at the Estadio Ciudad de Málaga in Málaga, Spain.

Final standings

Men's results

100 metres
28 JuneWind: +2.6 m/s

200 metres
29 JuneWind: +1.8 m/s

400 metres
28 June

800 metres
29 June

1500 metres
28 June

3000 metres
29 June

5000 metres
28 June

110 metres hurdles
29 JuneWind: -1.5 m/s

400 metres hurdles
28 June

3000 metres steeplechase
29 June

4 × 100 metres relay 
28 June

4 × 400 metres relay 
29 June

High jump
28 June

Pole vault
29 June

Long jump
28 June

Triple jump
29 June

Shot put
28 June

Discus throw
29 June

Hammer throw
28 June

Javelin throw
29 June

Women's results

100 metres
28 JuneWind: +2.4 m/s

200 metres
29 JuneWind: +0.6 m/s

400 metres
28 June

800 metres
28 June

1500 metres
29 June

3000 metres
28 June

5000 metres
29 June

100 metres hurdles
29 JuneWind: +0.8 m/s

400 metres hurdles
28 June

3000 metressteeplechase
28 June

4 × 100 metres relay 
28 June

4 × 400 metres relay 
29 June

High jump
29 June

Pole vault
28 June

Long jump
29 June

Triple jump
28 June

Shot put
29 June

Discus throw
28 June

Hammer throw
29 June

Javelin throw
28 June

References

European Cup Super League
European
2006 in Spanish sport
International athletics competitions hosted by Spain
Sport in Málaga